Carrog is a village in the  community of Llanbadrig, Ynys Môn, Wales. Recent excavations of a circular hill-top enclosure show that people have inhabited this area since at least the Late Bronze Age or even the Early Iron Age.

References

See also
List of localities in Wales by population

Villages in Anglesey